Swedish Super League (formerly named Elitserien) is the highest league in the league system of Swedish women's floorball and comprises the top 14 Swedish floorball teams. The first season began in 1997–98. The season ends with the playoffs and a final.

History
The Elitserien for women was founded in 1997 and replaced the Division 1 leagues as the high level floorball league of Sweden. Between the seasons 1997–98 and 2005–06 the league was divided into a northern and a southern group. Since the 2006–07 season, it is a national league.

Season structure
The season starts with a regular season with 26 games per team, one home and one away against all teams. In the spring a play-off starts with the eight best teams from the regular season. The quarter finals as well as the semi finals is played in best of five matches, the final is settled in just one. The final is played in Stockholm Globe Arena together with the men's Swedish Super League final. The two last teams play in a relegation league to avoid relegation.

Current clubs
SSL clubs in season 2022–23:
 Åkersberga IBF
 Endre IF
 IBF Falun
 FBC Kalmarsund
 Karlstad IBF
 IBK Lund
 IK Sirius IBK
 Malmö FBC
 Nacka Wallenstam IBK
 Pixbo Wallenstam IBK
 Rönnby Västerås IBK
 Täby FC IBK
 Team Thorengruppen
 Warberg IC

Previous winners

1998 – Högdalens AIS
1999 – Högdalens AIS
2000 – Balrog IK
2001 – Balrog IK
2002 – Balrog IK
2003 – Balrog IK
2004 – Örnsköldsviks SK
2005 – IKSU
2006 – IKSU
2007 – Rönnby IBK
2008 – IKSU
2009 – Balrog IK
2010 – Rönnby IBK
2011 – Djurgårdens IF
2012 – IKSU
2013 – Rönnby IBK
2014 – Djurgårdens IF
2015 – KAIS Mora IF
2016 – Pixbo Wallenstam IBK
2017 – IKSU
2018 – IKSU
2019 – Täby FC
2020 – IKSU
2021 – Team Thorengruppen
2022 – Team Thorengruppen

References

External links

 Official website

Floorball competitions in Sweden
1997 establishments in Sweden
Sports leagues established in 1997
Sports leagues in Sweden
Professional sports leagues in Sweden